David Alexander Belcher (born 6 January 1967) is an Australian rower. He competed in the men's lightweight coxless four event at the 1996 Summer Olympics.

References

External links
 

1967 births
Living people
Australian male rowers
Olympic rowers of Australia
Rowers at the 1996 Summer Olympics
People from Penola, South Australia